Caramoor may refer to:

Caramoor International Music Festival, held at
Caramoor Center for Music and the Arts Inc., a former estate listed on the National Register of Historic Places near Katonah, New York